Parminder Singh Dhull (born 4 March 1957) is an Indian politician of the State of Haryana, India. He remained as Member of Legislative Assembly of Haryana from Julana constituency of Jind District till he resigned as such on 25 June 2019. He contested on Bhartiya Janta Party ticket in 2019 Haryana Assembly Elections but failed to retain his seat. He resigned from Bhartiya Janta Party on 20 October 2020 in protest of the Farmers Bills introduced by Government of India. His father Chaudhary Dal Singh was a former minister and a freedom fighter.

Early career
Parminder Singh Dhull lost by a narrow margin in first election contested by him in 1991.

Later career
Dhull bagged the INLD party ticket for the 2009 assembly elections and won by a record margin of nearly 13000 votes from Julana, a constituency that borders Rohtak district and Kiloi, the constituency represented by the then Chief Minister Bhupinder Singh Hooda. In the 2014 Lok Sabha elections, Julana was among the few constituencies from where INLD emerged to be a winner, in the 2014 Haryana Assembly Elections Julana again voted for him and he won by a margin of around 23000 votes, the second highest by an INLD candidate.

In both the terms, 2009–14 and 2014–19, he has been one of the most vocal and active parliamentarians of Haryana Vidhan Sabha. From asking maximum number of questions to leading the table in Calling Attention Motions or Supplementary Questions list, he has numerous state as well as national level protests and unique campaigns to his credit. He has served as a member of various committees of the Vidhan Sabha. During Budget Session of 2018 he protested outside Haryana Assembly for raise of price of crops. He is reported to be the first MLA in the state history to have published his own Report Card that highlights the issues and campaigns led by him for the people of the state.

Memberships
Remained member of State Executive of the Indian National Lok Dal

Assembly Committees
Member, Committee on Public Accounts for the year 2009-10
Member, Committee on Public Accounts for the year 2010-11
Member, Committee on Public Accounts for the year 2011-12
Member, Committee on Public Accounts for the year 2012-13
Member, Committee on Government Assurance for the year 2013-14
Member, Committee on Public Accounts for the year 2014-15
Member, Rules Committee for the year 2015-16
Special Invitee, Committee on Government Assurance for the year 2015-16
Member, Committee on Public Accounts for the year 2016-17
Chairman, Committee on Government Assurance for the year 2017-18
Member, Rules Committee for the year 2017-18
Member, Committee on Public Accounts for the year 2018-19

References

1957 births
Living people
Indian National Lok Dal politicians
Haryana MLAs 2009–2014
Haryana MLAs 2014–2019
Bharatiya Janata Party politicians from Haryana